= Radar Music Videos =

Radar Music Investments Ltd
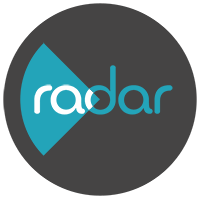
- Company type: Private
- Industry: Advertising; Music Video; Animation; Interactive; Design; Fashion
- Founded: 2007; 19 years ago
- Headquarters: London, United Kingdom
- Area served: Global
- Owner: Russell Glenister
- Website: https://www.radarmusicvideos.com

Radar Music Videos is a music video commissioning company based at RAK Studios in London. The service allows labels, artists, and managers to commission music videos from new directors. Their website has been closed since 2023.

Radar was founded by Caroline Bottomley in 2007 as The Radar Festival, a music video festival held at London’s Apple store. In 2008, the festival played at seven Apple stores worldwide, as well as London’s Institute of Contemporary Arts. It subsequently moved online to become a music video commissioning service.

Artists that have had music videos made through the service include Alt-J and Jessie J.

Radar has also been used by dance music producers and labels, including Tiesto, Spinnin' Records and Ultramusic, alongside major labels such as Island Records and Universal Records.

Directors such as Emile Rafael, Ellis Bahl and Tom Stoddart have used the service in their music careers.

On October 27, 2015, Radar Music Video announced a partnership with boutique digital marketing and creative services company, Sneak Attack Media.

== Awards ==
Radar won the Music 4.5 2011 tech startup competition, and was awarded for Excellence in Music Technology at the 2012 Lovie Awards.

Videos commissioned through Radar have been nominated for UK Music Video Awards, including videos by The Candle Thieves and ArtOfficial. Alt-J won 2012 'Best Alternative Video' for 'Breezeblocks'.

== See also ==
- Music video director
